Edwin Serrano, better known by his stage name Lil' Eddie, is a Filipino and Puerto Rican pop, R&B/soul singer-songwriter and a record producer.

Life and career

2004-2009 
Previously signed to Yellowman/Big 3 Records in 2004, he left the label the following year, leaving behind an unreleased album, Nobody's Fool. He later released an album, City of My Heart, in 2009. His third studio album, Already Yours, followed two years later.

2009-2014 
Lil Eddie joined the artist development team at The X Factor US. La Banda, America's Got Talent alongside Simon Cowell.  There he helped bring together the ladies of Fifth Harmony as well as coaching the contestants season after season.The band BTS posted Lil Eddie his song "Statue" in 2013 and 2014 what made the song being Shazam top 100 song. Lil Eddie embraces his multicultural background and talents. He has produced, and written for Latin superstars Maluma, Daddy Yankee, Prince Royce and once again lent his talents to Univision's reality competition series, La Banda, where he helped develop and launch the Latin boy band, CNCO.

2018-2022 
Lil Eddie is a versatile Producer, Songwriter some of his latest placements are Charlie Wilson “Chills” which was #1 for 3 weeks on Billboard's Urban AC chart, Maluma feat. Jason Derulo “La Ex”, Eurovison's own Eleni Foureira  hit song “Fuego”, Boy bands RAK-SU smash single “Dimelo” and Disney records bands In Real Life single “How Badly”.

In 2019 Lil Eddie wrote a poem with Leslie Grace for Hispanic Heritage Month on Spotify, which was nominated for Webby Awards.

Lil Eddie made an impressive impact in Japan especially – with five #1 albums and the demand for a Greatest Hits release.  In 2021 Lil Eddie has joined up with ONErpm and released his new single “Figura” on October 29. In 2021 the singer RM (rapper) of BTS posted "Statue" again on social media what made the song hit 30 million streams on Spotify and over 250 million views on YouTube.

Lil Eddie started his own label "Broken Hearts Club" in 2020. He signed his first artist "Yung Raf" and they released his first song "Outside" featuring Lil Eddie in October 17.

Discography

Albums

Singles

As featured artist

Songwriting credits

Filmography

Television

References

External links
Lil' Eddie website
Lil' Eddie, EMI Publishing
Lil' Eddie on VK

1988 births
Living people
American rhythm and blues musicians
American musicians of Filipino descent